(noun; lit. "rope master", "rope teacher"), is a word which in SM circles means "rope artist". Nawashi are those who have some recognized proficiency in the historic erotic art of Japanese bondage (緊縛 (lit. "tight binding" kinbaku)   or kinbaku-bi (lit.  bondage beauty  緊縛美).

Other terms used in Japan for rope artists within SM culture are "kinbakushi" and "bakushi", with "bakushi" being more typical.

In early 2007 a documentary movie entitled Bakushi produced by Naoya Narita and directed by Ryūichi Hiroki was released. In it, Hiroki interviews three Japanese ropemasters (bakushi), Chimuo Nureki, Haruki Yukimura, and Go Arisue, along with three of their models, Hiromi Saotome, Sumire, and Taeko Uzuki. 

Two famous nawashi are the late Osada Eikichi (2001) and Akechi Denki (2005). Other notable Japanese bakushi are Naka Akira, Haruki Yukimura, Hajime Kinoko, Randa Mai, Go Arisue, Chimuo Nureki and Chiba Eizoh. One notable female bakushi is Benio Takara.

The art of kinbaku has become more well-known in the West since the mid-1990s, with a number of notable non-Japanese practitioners shaping their rope art in Japanese inspired forms.

Glossary
 : (noun) bondage
 : (verb) to tie or bind
 : (noun) rope tying
 : (noun) literally,"a maker of rope", but in SM circles in means "rope artist" (source Master K's book "Shibari, The art of Japanese Bondage")
 : (noun) tight binding (bondage) master
 : (noun) abbreviated form of kinbakushi

See also
 Japanese bondage
 Bondage rigger

References

Further reading

External links
 Glossary: Terms Related to Japanese Shibari / Kinbaku / Bondage—See "Nawashi" 

 
Japanese sex terms
Ropework